Save My Love may refer to:

"Save My Love" (Justified), a 2011 episode of the TV series Justified
"Save My Love", song by Bruce Springsteen from The Promise (Bruce Springsteen album)
"Save My Love", song by Blue Murder from Nothin' but Trouble